Anonychomyrma anguliceps is a species of ant in the genus Anonychomyrma. Described by Forel in 1901, the species is endemic to New Guinea.

References

Anonychomyrma
Insects of New Guinea
Insects described in 1901
Taxa named by Auguste Forel
Endemic fauna of New Guinea